The 2012 Nevada Wolf Pack football team represented the University of Nevada, Reno in the 2012 NCAA Division I FBS football season. The Wolf Pack were led by Chris Ault in his 28th overall and 9th straight season since taking over as head coach for the third time in 2004 and later resigned from coaching at the end of the season. They played their home games at Mackay Stadium and were first–year members of the Mountain West Conference. They finished the season 7–6 and 4–4 in Mountain West play to finish in fifth place. They were invited to the New Mexico Bowl where they lost to Arizona.

Preseason

Mountain West media days
The Mountain West media days were held on July 24–26, 2012, at the Cosmopolitan in Paradise, Nevada.

Media poll
The preseason poll was released on July 24, 2012. The Wolf Pack were predicted to finish in second place.

Preseason All–Mountain West Team
The Wolf Pack had four players selected to the preseason All–Mountain West Team; three from the offense and one from the defense.

Offense

Stefphon Jefferson – RB

Brandon Wimberly – WR

Jeff Nady – OL

Defense

Albert Rosette – LB

Schedule

Rankings

Personnel

Game summaries

at California

South Florida

Northwestern State

at Hawaii

at Texas State

Wyoming

at UNLV

San Diego State

at Air Force

Fresno State

at New Mexico

Boise State

vs. Arizona (New Mexico Bowl)

Players in the 2013 NFL Draft

Team Awards
The 2012 Team Awards were handed out December 9, 2012.

Golden Helmet Award (MVP)
Albert Rosette, senior linebacker
Outstanding Offensive Player
Stefphon Jefferson, junior running back
Outstanding Defensive Player
Duke Williams, senior safety
Outstanding Special Teams Player
Khalid Wooten, senior punt returner
Nevadatude Award (best representative of the beliefs and ideals of the program)
Zach Sudfeld, senior tight end
Basalite Big Blocker (given the offensive lineman who grades out the best in victories)
Matt Galas – UNLV
Joel Bitonio – Northwestern State, Hawaii, Wyoming
Jeff Nady – Cal, Texas State, New Mexico
Blackout Award (big hitter)
Duke Williams, senior safety
Fireman's Award (stepping up in a time of need)
Devin Combs, sophomore quarterback
Full-speed, Effort and Habit Awards (scout team players of the year)
Offense: Chris Solomon, freshman running back
Defense: Gabe Lee, sophomore defensive back

References

Nevada
Nevada Wolf Pack football seasons
Nevada Wolf Pack football